Iron Soldier 2 is an open world first-person mecha simulation video game developed by Eclipse Software Design and published by Telegames for the Atari Jaguar and Atari Jaguar CD on December 30, 1997. It is the sequel to Iron Soldier.

Set after the events of the first game, players assume the role of an elite defense pilot taking control of the titular mech in order to complete tasks and protect areas that conforms the United Republic from attacks of the PENTA corporation, a former rival of the now-disbanded Iron Fist Corporation. Conceived after release of the original title and originally announced in 1995, Iron Soldier 2 went almost unreleased after Atari discontinued both platforms and merged with JT Storage in 1996 until it was eventually picked up by Telegames, making it one of the last licensed titles for each system.

Iron Soldier 2 received very positive reception from critics with praise towards the graphics, soundtrack, controls, gameplay and variety, while most noted the sharp difficulty increase over its predecessor and received criticism for lack of music during gameplay on the cartridge version. It has been referred by Retro Gamer as one of the best titles for each platform. A sequel, Iron Soldier 3, which was released in 2000 for the PlayStation and in 2001 for the Nuon respectively.

Gameplay 

Iron Soldier 2 is a mech simulation game with free-roaming elements that is primarily played in a first-person perspective like its predecessor. The player takes control of the titular robot across 20 missions, each one varying in main objectives to complete such as acquiring new weapons and fighting against other Iron Soldier units, in order to stop attacks from PENTA corporation against the United Republic. The progress system acts similarly to the original game, where the first set of five missions must be completed in order to unlock another set. Players now start with three selectable weapons instead of only one and controls are relatively the same as with the first game. In addition to the returning enemy units from the original game, new ones are introduced in the sequel such as walker-like vehicles. Though progress after completing five missions and other setting changes are kept via the internal EEPROM on the cartridge version, a Memory Track cartridge must be present on the CD version to save progress and settings.

Plot 
After the defeat of Iron Fist Corporation, the Resistance formed a democratic government called United Republic. However, problems begin to arise when the PENTA corporation, a longtime rival of Iron Fist, are occupying areas from their former enemy and starts attacking the newly formed republic. As a result, a pilot from the defense force of the republic is assigned to take control of an Iron Soldier unit in order to defend republican territories against terrorist attacks from PENTA.

Development and release 

Atari Corporation requested Marc Rosocha and his team at Eclipse Software Design to start work on a sequel to Iron Soldier for the Atari Jaguar CD shortly after the game was released on the Jaguar. Development began after Eclipse obtained development kits for the Jaguar CD from Atari Corp., who were looking to publish "killer app" titles for the peripheral. Rosocha stated that Iron Soldier 2 would have been completed if they were not creating it for both cartridge and CD-ROM formats, with the former version being developed on Alpine development kits. The game was formally announced in video game magazines in 1995 for a Q4 1995/January 1996 release but only listing the CD version, with internal documents from Atari listing it as still being in development on August of the same year. Iron Soldier 2 features improved graphics with additional texture mapping while exploiting the system's hardware to improve visuals over those of the original game.

The project was near completion by the end of 1995, however, the team received news from Attention to Detail (best known for Cybermorph and Battlemorph) that they were no longer working on new titles for the platform due to rumors of Atari preparing to exit the home video game console business and as a result, Rosocha proceeded to contact then-product development director John Skruch at the company in regards to these rumors. A few weeks later, the team received information from Skruch that executives at Atari decided to put on hold upcoming software for the system and confirmed that the company was also exiting the console market, but other internal documents from the company listed the game as still in development on December 1995.

Iron Soldier 2 remained being previewed in magazines and was also showcased during the Fun 'n' Games Day event hosted by Atari in January 1996, but the company started cancelling upcoming projects for the system such as Black ICE\White Noise and Thea Realm Fighters in the next month before merging with JTS in a reverse takeover and filed a 10-K405 SEC Filing two months later, which meant that the game would not be published by Atari until it was finished and released in 1997 by Telegames. The game was originally planned to feature a two-player mode, with Scott Le Grand of 4Play (known for his work on BattleSphere) stating that Atari requested a working network code to be implemented into the game for multiplayer but this feature was scrapped in the final version of the game.

Iron Soldier 2 was released on December 30, 1997 for the Atari Jaguar and Atari Jaguar CD by Telegames, becoming one of the first titles on the platform to be released on both formats. Being a late release after the discontinuation of both platforms, the game could be purchased either through direct order from Telegames' US and UK websites or retailers such as Electronics Boutique. Differences between the cartridge and CD versions are the lack of full motion video cutscenes and Red Book audio, among others changes. Before being finished and released for both systems, Rosocha approached Sega for a potential port of the game to the Sega Saturn and despite liking the offer, members from the company talked with him and stated that the system was not going to be a success, and that the team could have a similar situation with Atari and as such, work on the port was never started. Plans to release the game on Macintosh, PC and PlayStation were also slated but never released as well. In March 2017, a ROM image of an early 1995 build of the cartridge version was leaked online by video game collector Frédéric Moreau at AtariAge.

Reception 

Iron Soldier 2 received very positive reviews from critics and has been referred by Retro Gamer as one of the best titles for both the Atari Jaguar and Jaguar CD. AllGames Kyle Knight praised the game for the improved audiovisual presentation compared to its predecessor, as well as the enemy and weapon variety but noted that its difficulty curve was higher than the original Iron Soldier. GamePros Dan Elektro also commended the texture-mapped polygonal visuals, soundtrack and controls, stating that "Iron Soldier 2 is a must-have for fans of the original cart — and an instantly playable, high-energy game for all action fans." Ralph Karels of German magazine Video Games gave the title a perfect score.

In a similar manner as Knight, Atari Gaming Headquarterss Keita Iida noted that it was a much more difficult game compared to the first Iron Soldier but praised the improved audiovisual presentation over its predecessor and gameplay, stating that "All in all, Iron Soldier 2 is solid and fun, and the missions are as challenging and complex as ever." Digital Presss Edward Villapando commended the sequel for improving the formula established by the first game but, like Knight and Iida, noted that the game was difficult and stated that the action was "unforgiving" with the introduction of new enemies alongside old ones. ST-Computers Helge Bollinger gave a positive review in regards to the title as well.

References

External links 
 
 Iron Soldier 2 at AtariAge
 Iron Soldier 2 at MobyGames

1997 video games
Atari games
Atari Jaguar games
Atari Jaguar CD games
Atari Jaguar-only games
Cancelled classic Mac OS games
Cancelled PC games
Cancelled PlayStation (console) games
Cancelled Sega Saturn games
Eclipse Software Design games
First-person shooters
Video games about mecha
Single-player video games
Telegames games
Video games developed in Germany
Video game sequels
Video games set in the future